The People's Sunday celebrations are held on the first Sunday of Lent at Żabbar, Malta, popularly known as Ħadd in-Nies, are living recollections of the centuries-old devotion to Our Lady of Graces (Il-Madonna tal-Grazzja). The Maltese name of Ħadd in-Nies, People's Sunday, is an indication of the large number of visitors who used to go to Żabbar to render thanks and pray at the feet of Our Lady.

For many centuries, people from all walks of life, locals and foreigners, participated. On 6 March 1927, Archbishop Dom Mauro Caruana OSB participated in the renewed religious celebration of People's Sunday; today Archbishop Charles Scicluna is visiting the Żabbar Sanctuary of Our Lady of Graces, to meet the clergy, and above all participate in the pilgrimage of People's Sunday.

Evidence of the earliest devotion to Our Lady of Graces came to light in 1954 with the discovery of a late 15th-century fresco in the early Melitan-style chapel of St Domenica in Żabbar. The earliest surviving 16th century reports by Bishops give us an insight into the devotion to Our Lady.

The fragmentary report of 1570 by Mgr Antonio Bartolo, Vicar General sede vacante, just five years after the Great Siege of Malta in 1565, gives us a further indication of the popularity of this devotion. The four-page inventory of the furnishings of Our Lady of Graces Chapel shows us a number of richly woven sacred vestments, silver necklaces, precious ornaments together with humble altar cloths. This clearly indicates that both rich and poor flocked to this sacred spot.

This is, again, fully supported by the report of Apostolic Delegate Pietro Dusina of 1575. His description of churches and chapels in Malta and Gozo incidentally shows that the Żabbar Our Lady of Graces chapel was the only one under this title on the Islands. This was a factor that surely helped to attract more people. A hundred years had to pass before another chapel was dedicated to Our Lady of Graces, which was built at Ħal Missilment in Naxxar, Malta.

Msgr Dusina was very impressed by the great attachment of people to the Żabbar chapel. He wrote that many pilgrims from various towns and villages went there to implore favours or render thanks for benefits received, leaving behind offerings of all sorts, which eventually covered all the walls of this chapel. Most of these pilgrims went every Wednesday all the year around. Two or three Masses were said on these days to meet the visitor demand. This was not so common elsewhere in those times, where only one Mass was celebrated annually on the patron saint's feast day. To cater for these pilgrims, Msgr Dusina appointed Fr Antonio De Nicolaci as rector of this chapel "to foster and strengthen this holy devotion among the people."

The practice of going on a pilgrimage as a sign of penance and a closer approach to God goes back to the early centuries of the Christian Church. In Rome, the faithful assembled at an agreed church station and followed the Pope or a Church dignitary to another station chapel. They recited prayers and chanted the penitential psalms all along the route.

By 1585, the Żabbar chapel proved too small to accommodate the ever increasing number of pilgrims. Grand Master Hugues Loubenx de Verdalle helped to extend the church and donated a new titular painting. At the same time, Pope Sixtus V granted 100 days of Indulgence to all visitors. In 1636, just 20 years after the chapel had been elevated into a parish before splitting with Żejtun, Bishop Michaele Belageur described the large quantity of ex-voto offerings, and stated that of all the churches on the islands, this one attracts the greatest devotion: devotissima est.

Similar comments were made even by later bishops when they visited Żabbar. A typical remark is that made by Bishop Alpheran de Bussan (1728-1757), who in his 1737 visit states: "From olden times a large number of people converged to this church of Our Lady of Graces to offer thanks for the miraculous favours received. "The people offered gifts to fulfill vows, leaving behind small paintings, chains, weapons and all kinds of trophies of war as a sign of gratitude to God and Holy Mary. One every Wednesday and especially on Ash Wednesday, the number of these pilgrims from cities, towns and villages is even greater." The inventories of this church, especially those of 1679 and 1699, list many of these donations.

Social gathering
In the meantime, Carnival celebrations were becoming more organised. Thus a new aspect was added to these Lenten pilgrimages. Those who might have misbehaved or somehow gone beyond their Christian duties during Carnival, felt they could show repentance by taking part in these pilgrimages.

Ash Wednesday, being a normal working day with abstinence and fasting, proved inconvenient for many. The crowds preferred to satisfy their obligations on the following Sunday, the first of Lent. During the following century, this change seemed to have been well established.

In fact, George Percy Badger, who was in Malta in 1838 stated that it was still practised on Ash Wednesday. However, an updated edition of 1858 states that the pilgrimage took place on Palm Sunday (Ħadd in-Nies).

References 

Catholic holy days
Christianity in Malta
Maltese culture
Holidays based on the date of Easter
Lent
Żabbar
February observances
March observances
Christian Sunday observances